Billy Broomfield (born January 15, 1945) is an American politician. He was a member of the Mississippi House of Representatives from the 110th District, from 1992 to 2013. He is a member of the Democratic Party. He was elected mayor of Moss Point, Mississippi in 2013. Running as an independent, he lost reelection to Democrat Mario King in 2017.

References

1945 births
Living people
African-American mayors in Mississippi
African-American state legislators in Mississippi
Mayors of places in Mississippi
Democratic Party members of the Mississippi House of Representatives
People from Moss Point, Mississippi
21st-century American politicians
21st-century African-American politicians
20th-century African-American people